The Planet Savers is a science fantasy novel by American writer Marion Zimmer Bradley, part of her Darkover series. It was first published in book form in English by Ace Books in 1962, dos-à-dos with Bradley's novel The Sword of Aldones. The story first appeared in the November 1958 issue of the magazine Amazing Stories. It subsequently appeared in a German translation in 1960 with additional chapters added that were not by the author.

The Planet Savers takes place at least 152 years after the events described in Rediscovery.

Plot summary
Desperate to discover a cure for the cyclical 48-year-fever, known as Trailmen’s fever, Dr. Randall Forth persuades a colleague, Dr. Jay Allison, to undergo hypnosis. He calls forth a secondary personality, Jason Allison, who is gregarious and an experienced mountain climber, while Dr. Jay Allison is a cold, clinical man with no outdoor skills.

Jason is asked to lead an expedition into the Hellers to collect medical volunteers from among the Trailmen. Accompanying him are Rafe Scott, Regis Hastur, Kyla Raineach, a Renunciate guide, and several others. During the trip, Jay/Jason yo-yos between his two personalities – one warm and charming, the other distant and clinical. Jason, the warm personality, falls in love with Kyla.

They are attacked on the trail by a party of hostile Trailwomen. As a result of the attack, the Jay personality reappears, and is considerably more formal than the Jason personality. When they reach the Trailmen nest where Jay/Jason lived as a child, he is recognized. The party is invited into the Trailmen’s tree habitat.

The Old Ones of the Sky People (Trailmen) inquire why Jay/Jason has brought an armed party of humans to their nest. Jay/Jason explains his mission, to find a remedy for 48-year-fever. He introduces Regis Hastur to the Old Ones, and Regis also pleads for the Sky People's assistance. One hundred Trailmen volunteer. The party, with volunteers, returns to the Terran Trade City.

Some months later, a serum is developed for the treatment of 48-year-fever. Regis Hastur arrives to congratulate Jay/Jason Allison. The exposure to Regis reminds Jay/Jason of the expedition, and causes Jay/Jason to merge into a third, more stable personality.

Characters
 Jay/Jason Allison
 Dr. Randall Forth, psychiatrist
 Regis Hastur, the Darkover regent's grandson
 Kyla Raineach, Renunciate back country guide
 Buck Kendricks, a spaceforce man
 Rafe Scott, half Darkovan/half Terran

Publication history
 1958, USA, Amazing Stories, pub date November 1958, magazine publication
 1960, Germany, Utopia-Zukunftsroman , pub date 1960, in German as Dr. Allisons zweites Ich with additional material not by Bradley
 1962, USA, Ace Books , pub date September 1962, paperback, dos-à-dos with The Sword of Aldones
 1979, USA, Gregg Press , pub date 1979, hardcover
 1979, UK, Arrow Books , pub date 1979, paperback
 1980, USA, Ace Books , pub date 1980, paperback, with The Sword of Aldones, an additional short story and an article
 1995, USA, DAW Books , pub date April 1995, paperback, with The Winds of Darkover

References

Sources

External links
 

Darkover books
1962 American novels
Novels by Marion Zimmer Bradley
American science fiction novels
Works originally published in Amazing Stories
Books with cover art by Ed Emshwiller
Ace Books books